Yeah Ghost is the fourth studio album by Zero 7, released in September 2009. The album features vocals by ESKA (on "Mr McGee", "Medicine Man", "Sleeper", and "The Road"), Martha Tilston (on "Pop Art Blue"), Binki Shapiro (on "Swing" and "Ghost Symbol"), Rowdy Superstar (on "Sleeper"), and Binns himself (on "Everything Up (Zizou)", an homage to French footballer Zinedine Zidane).

Track listing

References

Zero 7 albums
2009 albums
Atlantic Records albums
Intelligent dance music albums
Ambient albums by English artists